Bright Lights, Big City is a 1988 American drama film directed by James Bridges, starring Michael J. Fox, Kiefer Sutherland, Phoebe Cates, Dianne Wiest and Jason Robards, and based on the novel by Jay McInerney, who also wrote the screenplay. It was the last film directed by Bridges, who died in 1993.

Plot
The film follows one week in the life of 24-year-old Jamie Conway. Originally from Pennsylvania, Jamie works as a fact-checker for a major New York City magazine. His nights partying with his glib best friend Tad and his addiction to cocaine has led Jamie being frequently late to work and not finishing assignments on time. As result, he is on the verge of getting fired by his stern boss, Clara Tillinghast.

His wife Amanda, a fast-rising model, has just left him. He is also still reeling from the death of his mother from cancer a year earlier; and he follows a tabloid story about a pregnant woman in a coma. Jamie's story captures some of the glossy chaos and decadence of NYC nightlife during the 1980s and Jamie also finds himself desperately trying to escape the pain in his life.

After Jamie gets fired from his job, he goes on a further downward spiral with more substance and alcohol abuse. He attempts to go on a date with Tad's cousin Vicky as a favor so Tad could, in turn, have a fling with a woman he claims is a Penthouse Pet. Jamie also avoids phone calls from his younger brother Michael who has come to the city to look for him.

His maternal co-worker Megan attempts to help Jamie out with finding a new job as well as try to open up about his troubled life and the reason why Amanda left him. Michael arrives at his apartment and lets himself in, surprising Jamie. Tad calls him to tell him Amanda is at a party he is attending.

At the party, Tad is so intoxicated that he doesn't seem to realize that a woman he is flirting with is actually a man in drag. Jamie confronts Amanda but retreats to the bathroom when his nose starts to bleed. He finally decides to open up and come clean with himself before he ends up either dead or in jail. Jamie phones Vicky from the party and tells her that he and his brother Michael helped their dying mother kill herself to end her suffering. Jamie then declines Tad's offer to spend more time together and leaves the party.

Jamie wanders the streets until dawn when he decides that today will be a better day to get his life back on track. As the film ends, a news clipping of the newborn "Coma Baby" is shown.

Cast

 Michael J. Fox as Jamie Conway
 Kiefer Sutherland as Tad Allagash
 Phoebe Cates as Amanda Conway
 Swoosie Kurtz as Megan
 Frances Sternhagen as Clara Tillinghast
 Tracy Pollan as Vicky Allagash
 John Houseman as Mr. Vogel
 Charlie Schlatter as Michael Conway
 David Warrilow as Rittenhouse
 Dianne Wiest as Mrs. Conway
 Alec Mapa as Yasu Wade
 William Hickey as Ferret Man
 Gina Belafonte as Kathy
 Sam Robards as Rich Vanier
 Jessica Lundy as Theresa
 Kelly Lynch as Elaine
 Annabelle Gurwitch as Barbara
 Maria Pitillo as Pony Tail Girl
 David Hyde Pierce as Bartender at Fashion Show
 Peg Murray as Receptionist
 Jason Robards as Mr. Hardy

Production and development
In 1984, Robert Lawrence, a vice president at Columbia Pictures, championed Jay McInerney's novel against resistance from older executives. He felt that the book spoke to his generation and described it as "Graduate, with a little bit of Lost Weekend". The studio agreed to make the film with Jerry Weintraub producing and Joel Schumacher directing. McInerney wrote a draft of the screenplay and, soon afterward, Schumacher started rewriting it. Actor Emilio Estevez was interested in adapting it into a film. He met with McInerney while he was still working on the screenplay. Tom Cruise was offered first refusal on the script while McInerney and Schumacher were attempting to capture the novel's distinctive voice. McInerney, Cruise and Schumacher scouted locations in New York City and checked out the atmosphere of the club scenes described in the novel. At one point, Judd Nelson, Estevez, Zach Galligan, Sean Penn, Kevin Bacon, and Rob Lowe were all considered for the role of Allagash.

In 1985, Weintraub took the property to United Artists when he became chief executive there. The film needed a new producer so Sydney Pollack and Mark Rosenberg took over. They hired writer Julie Hickson to write a script. Cruise and Schumacher grew tired of waiting for a workable script, but before they could be replaced, Weintraub left United Artists. The project became entangled in a complicated settlement with the studio, months being lost before it finally stayed at United Artists. A decision was made to shoot the film in Toronto and cast an unknown in the leading role.

Joyce Chopra was hired to co-write the script, with her husband Tom Cole, and also direct it. She had her agent send a copy of McInerney's novel to Michael J. Fox. The actor won the leading role and, at his request, the part of Tad Allagash went to fellow Canadian Kiefer Sutherland. Fox's casting increased the budget to $15 million and principal photography was moved to New York City. The producers hired a crew, many of whom had worked with Pollack, while Chopra brought along the cinematographer from her first film, Smooth Talk, James Glennon.

Fox had to be back in Los Angeles to start taping his television series Family Ties by mid-July, giving Chopra only ten weeks to finish the film. Studio executives did not like what Chopra was shooting and, a week into filming, the studio's chairman and its president of production flew from L.A. to New York City to check on the film. Neither had read the script and both were unaware of how different it was from the novel. McInerney has said that Cole wrote all the drugs out of the script while Cole said that he did this on instructions from Pollack, who was worried that the film would hurt Fox's wholesome image with audiences. Cole recalls, "There was definitely pressure and concern at that time about how Michael was seen by America." The studio announced that "a more experienced director" was needed as a result of an impending strike by the Directors Guild of America. On the short list of possible replacements were Ulu Grosbard, Bruce Beresford, and James Bridges. Bridges received a call on a Friday that the film was in trouble, read the novel that night, and flew to New York City on Sunday. He agreed to direct if he could start from scratch and hire Gordon Willis as his cinematographer.

In seven days, Bridges wrote a new draft bringing back the darker elements of the novel such as the main character's heavy drinking and drug abuse and replaced six actors, casting instead Jason Robards, John Houseman, Swoosie Kurtz, Frances Sternhagen, and Tracy Pollan, while keeping Sutherland and Dianne Wiest. The new cast members read the novel because there was no script at the time. The strike forced the production to shoot in seven weeks and use McInerney's first draft, which Bridges liked the best. Bridges worked on the script on weekends with McInerney, who was enlisted to help with revisions. The two agreed to share screenwriting credit but the Writers Guild of America decided to give it to McInerney only.

The cocaine that Fox snorts in the film was a prop called milk sugar. The filmmakers shot two different endings—one where Fox's character decides to start his life all over but is vague with what he specifically plans to do and an alternative one, to please the studio, where he has finished writing a novel to be called Bright Lights, Big City with a new girlfriend who is proud of what he has written.

Reception
Bright Lights, Big City was released on April 1, 1988, in 1,196 theaters, and grossed USD $5.1 million during its opening weekend. The film went on to make $16.1 million domestically, well below its budget of $25 million.

The film received mixed reviews from critics and has a 60% rating on Rotten Tomatoes, based on 20 reviews. In his review for Newsweek, David Ansen wrote, "Bright Lights isn't an embarrassment, like Less Than Zero; it's a smooth, professional job. But when it's over you may shrug your shoulders and ask, "Is that all?" Janet Maslin, wrote in her review for The New York Times, "Mr. Bridges may not have breathed fire into this material, but he has preserved most of its better qualities. He has treated it with intelligence, respect and no undue reverence, assembling a coherent film that resists any hint of exploitation". In his review for The Washington Post, Hal Hinson criticized Fox's performance, stating that he "was the wrong actor for the job. Fox, who in The Secret of My Succe$s showed a gift for light comedy, is too stylized a performer for the heavier stuff; he has no natural weight. In addition, Fox shows a reluctance to let the audience see him in an unflattering light". However, Roger Ebert praised the actor's performance: "Fox is very good in the central role (he has a long drunken monologue that is the best thing he has ever done in a movie)". Time magazine's Richard Schickel felt that the film, "arrives... looking like something that has been kicking around too long in the dead-letter office".

Home video
A special edition DVD version of Bright Lights, Big City was released on September 2, 2008. In her review for The Washington Post, Jen Chaney wrote, "In the end, that's what is most disappointing about this DVD. What could have become a compelling look at a seminal novel of the 1980s and its rocky path through Hollywood ends up being a rudimentary release with a couple of decent commentary tracks and two forgettable featurettes".

Remake
On July 31, 2010, the story's author stated in an NPR All Things Considered interview that Gossip Girl co-creator Josh Schwartz would remake an updated version of the film.

Soundtrack

Track listing

References

External links

 
 
 
 
 
 

1988 films
1988 drama films
American drama films
1980s English-language films
Films about alcoholism
Films about drugs
Films about euthanasia
Films based on American novels
Films directed by James Bridges
Films set in New York City
United Artists films
Films produced by Sydney Pollack
1980s American films